Malva is a genus of herbaceous annual, biennial, and perennial plants in the family Malvaceae.  It is one of several closely related genera in the family to bear the common English name mallow. The genus is widespread throughout the temperate, subtropical and tropical regions of Africa, Asia and Europe. 

The leaves are alternate, palmately lobed. The flowers are from 0.5–5 cm diameter, with five pink, lilac, purple or white petals.

Etymology
The word "mallow" is derived from Old English "mealwe", which was imported from Latin "malva", cognate with Ancient Greek μαλάχη (malakhē) meaning "mallow", both perhaps reflecting a Mediterranean term.

The colour mauve was in 1859 named after the French name for this plant.

Uses

Ornamental plant
Several species are widely grown as garden flowers. Very easily grown, short-lived perennials are often grown as ornamental plants.

Food
Many species are edible as leaf vegetables and commonly foraged in the West. Known as ebegümeci in Turkish, it is used as vegetable in Turkey in various forms such as stuffing the leaves with bulgur or rice or using the boiled leaves as side dish. Malva verticillata (Korean:  auk) is grown on a limited commercial scale in China; when made as a herbal infusion, it is used for its colon cleansing properties and as a weight loss supplement.

In the Levant, Malva nicaeensis leaves and fruit are used as food (e.g., khubeza patties).

Mild tasting, young mallow leaves can be a substitute for lettuce, whereas older leaves are better cooked as a leafy green vegetable. The buds and flowers can be used in salads. Small fruits that grow on the plants can also be eaten raw.

Bodos of Northeast India cultivate a subspecies of Malva called lapha and use it extensively in their traditional cuisine, although its use is not much known among other people of India except in the northern Indian state of Kashmir where Malva leaves are a highly cherished vegetable dish. It is called "Soachal".

Medical use
In Catalonia (Spain) they use the leaves to cure the sting or paresthesia of the stinging nettle (Urtica dioica).

Leaves of various species Malva have been used in traditional Austrian medicine internally as tea or externally as baths for treatment of disorders of the skin, gastrointestinal tract and respiratory tract. The leaves can also be chewed to soothe coughs or sore throats.

Cultivation
Cultivation is by sowing the seeds directly outdoors in early spring. The seed is easy to collect, and they will often spread themselves by seed.

Some Malva species are invasive weeds, particularly in the Americas where they are not native.

History
This plant is one of the earliest cited in recorded literature. The third century BC physician Diphilus of Siphnus wrote that "[mallow] juice lubricates the windpipe, nourishes, and is easily digested." Horace mentions it in reference to his own diet, which he describes as very simple: "Me pascunt olivae, / me cichorea levesque malvae" ("As for me, olives, endives, and mallows provide sustenance"). Lord Monboddo describes his translation of an ancient epigram that demonstrates Malva was planted upon the graves of the ancients, stemming from the belief that the dead could feed on such perfect plants.

Species
The following species are accepted:

Malva acerifolia (Cav.) Alef.
Malva × adulterina Wallr.
Malva aegyptia L.
Malva aethiopica C.J.S.Davis
Malva agrigentina (Tineo) Soldano, Banfi & Galasso
Malva alcea L. – greater musk-mallow, vervain mallow
Malva arborea (L.) Webb & Berthel.
Malva × arbosii Sennen
Malva assurgentiflora (Kellogg) M.F.Ray – island mallow, mission mallow, royal mallow, island tree mallow
Malva bucharica Iljin
Malva cachemiriana (Cambess.) Alef.
Malva cavanillesiana Raizada
Malva × clementii (Cheek) Stace
Malva × columbretensis (Juan & M.B.Crespo) Juan & M.B.Crespo
Malva cretica Cav.
Malva durieui Spach
Malva × egarensis Cadevall
Malva flava (Desf.) Alef.
Malva hispanica L.
Malva × inodora Ponert
Malva × intermedia Boreau
Malva leonardii I.Riedl
Malva lindsayi (Moran) M.F.Ray
Malva × litoralis Dethard. ex Rchb.
Malva longiflora (Boiss. & Reut.) Soldano, Banfi & Galasso
Malva ludwigii (L.) Soldano, Banfi & Galasso
Malva lusitanica (L.) Valdés
Malva maroccana (Batt. & Trab.) Verloove & Lambinon
Malva microphylla (Baker f.) Molero & J.M.Monts.
Malva moschata L. – musk-mallow
Malva multiflora (Cav.) Soldano, Banfi & Galasso
Malva neglecta Wallr. – dwarf mallow, buttonweed, cheeseplant, cheeseweed, common mallow, roundleaf mallow
Malva nicaeensis All. – French mallow, bull mallow
Malva oblongifolia (Boiss.) Soldano, Banfi & Galasso
Malva occidentalis (S.Watson) M.F.Ray
Malva olbia (L.) Alef.
Malva oxyloba Boiss.
Malva pacifica M.F.Ray
Malva pamiroalaica Iljin
Malva parviflora L. – least mallow, cheeseweed, cheeseweed mallow, small-whorl mallow
Malva phoenicea (Vent.) Alef.
Malva preissiana Miq. – Australian hollyhock
Malva punctata (All.) Alef.
Malva pusilla Sm. – small mallow
Malva qaiseri Abedin
Malva setigera K.F.Schimp. & Spenn.
Malva stenopetala (Coss. & Durieu ex Batt.) Soldano, Banfi & Galasso
Malva stipulacea Cav.
Malva subovata (DC.) Molero & J.M.Monts.
Malva sylvestris L. – common mallow, high mallow
Malva × tetuanensis Pau
Malva thuringiaca (L.) Vis.
Malva tournefortiana L.
Malva trimestris (L.) Salisb.
Malva unguiculata (Desf.) Alef.
Malva valdesii (Molero & J.M.Monts.) Soldano, Banfi & Galasso
Malva verticillata L. – Chinese mallow, cluster mallow
Malva vidalii (Pau) Molero & J.M.Monts.
Malva waziristanensis Blatt.
Malva weinmanniana (Besser ex Rchb.) Conran
Malva xizangensis Y.S.Ye, L.Fu & D.X.Duan

References

External links

 
Malvaceae genera